Millom Heritage and Arts Centre, formerly known as the Millom Folk Museum and Millom Discovery Centre, is located in Millom, Cumbria, England. The museum has a full-scale drift mine exhibit and also houses information about the local poet Norman Nicholson, the Hodbarrow iron ore mines and social history all relating to Millom and nearby surrounding areas. The mining being responsible for the rapid growth of the village of Holborn Hill into the town of Millom by more than doubling the size of the settlement. It now has a RAF display, set up by the original founder of Haverigg RAF Museum, John Nixon. It also shows the men who died in World War 2 and has information about them

The museum is housed in Millom railway station buildings.

External links
 Millom Heritage and Arts - official site
 Entry in the 24 Hour Museum
 Visit Cumbria information
 Millom information website
The Cumbria Directory - Millom Folk Museum

Museums in Cumbria
Local museums in Cumbria
Millom